Guido Balzarini (21 October 1874 – 1935) was an Italian fencer. He won a gold medal in the team sabre competition at the 1924 Summer Olympics.

References

External links
 

1874 births
1935 deaths
Italian male fencers
Olympic fencers of Italy
Fencers at the 1924 Summer Olympics
Olympic gold medalists for Italy
Olympic medalists in fencing
People from Terni
Medalists at the 1924 Summer Olympics
Sportspeople from the Province of Terni